Maritza Martén García (born August 17, 1963 in Havana) is a retired discus thrower from Cuba who competed in the discus contest at the 1992 Summer Olympics and won the gold medal. She also won the 1987 Pan American Games.

International competitions

References

External reference
 
 
 

1963 births
Living people
Cuban female discus throwers
Olympic athletes of Cuba
Olympic gold medalists in athletics (track and field)
Olympic gold medalists for Cuba
Athletes (track and field) at the 1992 Summer Olympics
Athletes (track and field) at the 1996 Summer Olympics
Pan American Games gold medalists for Cuba
Pan American Games medalists in athletics (track and field)
Athletes (track and field) at the 1983 Pan American Games
Athletes (track and field) at the 1987 Pan American Games
Athletes (track and field) at the 1995 Pan American Games
World Athletics Championships athletes for Cuba
Universiade medalists in athletics (track and field)
Athletes from Havana
Central American and Caribbean Games silver medalists for Cuba
Competitors at the 1986 Central American and Caribbean Games
Competitors at the 1993 Central American and Caribbean Games
Universiade gold medalists for Cuba
Universiade bronze medalists for Cuba
Medalists at the 1992 Summer Olympics
Central American and Caribbean Games medalists in athletics
Medalists at the 1985 Summer Universiade
Medalists at the 1989 Summer Universiade
Competitors at the 1990 Goodwill Games
Medalists at the 1983 Pan American Games
Medalists at the 1995 Pan American Games
20th-century Cuban women
21st-century Cuban women